Polylophota barbarossa is a species of moth of the family Pyralidae. It is found in Papua New Guinea.

It has a wingspan of 38 mm.

References

External links
Images at boldsystems.org

Epipaschiinae
Moths described in 1906